Olt or OLT may refer to:

People:
 Károly Olt (1904–1985), Hungarian politician
 Mike Olt (born 1988), American baseball player

Places:
 Olt County, a county (județ) of Romania
 Olt (river), a river in Romania
 Olt Defile, a defile that has been cut into the Transyvanian Alps in south-central Romania by the river Olt 
 Lot (river), a river in France, formerly called the Olt
 Olton railway station, England (National Rail code: OLT)

In science and technology:
 OLT (mobile network), a former manual mobile telephone network in Norway
 Optical line termination, a piece of telecommunications equipment used for fiber-optic communications
 Orthotopic liver transplant, in medicine
 Overwhelmingly Large Telescope, a proposed optical telescope

Other uses:
 Orangutan Land Trust, a UK charity working for the long-term survival of the orangutan
 OLT, 1969 novel by Kenneth Gangemi 
 OLT Express Germany, a German airline